The BIS Hallmark is a hallmarking system for gold as well as silver jewellery sold in India certifying the purity of the metal. It certifies that the piece of jewellery conforms to a set of standards laid by the Bureau of Indian Standards, the national standards organization of India. India is the second biggest market for gold and its jewellery.

India imports in excess of 1000 tons annually  (including unofficially smuggled gold) with negligible local production. The annual gold imports are around 50 billion US$ next only to crude oil imports widening the trade deficit.

Gold 
The BIS system of hallmarking of gold jewellery began in April 2000. The standard specifications governing this system are IS 1417 (Grades of Gold and Gold Alloys, Jewellery/Artefacts), IS 1418 (Assaying of Gold in Gold Bullion, Gold alloys and Gold Jewellery/Artefacts), IS 2790 (Guidelines for Manufacture of 14, 18 and 22 carat Gold Alloys only ), IS 3095 (Gold solders for use in manufacture of jewellery).

The BIS hallmark 
BIS hallmark for gold jewelry consists of several components:
 The BIS logo 
 Purity of Gold either one of this 22K916 Corresponding to 22 Carat, 18K750 Corresponding to 18 Carat and 14K585 Corresponding to 14 Carat.
 6 digit alphanumeri HUID-HALLMARK UNIQUE IDENTIFICATION

Silver 
BIS introduced hallmarking for silver jewelry in December 2005 under IS 2112, the standard specification for 'Hallmarking of Silver Jewellery/Artefacts'.

Assaying & Hallmarking Centres 
The testing of the jewelry as well as the marking is done in approved Assaying & Hallmarking Centres across the nation. These are private undertakings approved as well as monitored by the BIS.

Legal status 
The mandatory status of hallmarking gold jewelry sold in India, although declared, is yet to be implemented. It will mandatory across the country from January 15, 2021. But it has a wide acceptance among consumers. This often leads to fake hallmarking of jewelry which is under the regular scrutiny of the bureau.

See also 
Gold import policy of India
Certification marks in India
ISI mark

References 

 Certification marks
 Certification marks in India
 Gold in India
 Jewellery industry in India
 Silver